Line 2 of the Saint Petersburg Metro, also known as Moskovsko-Petrogradskaya Line or Blue Line, is a second oldest rapid transit line in Saint Petersburg, Russia, opened in 1961, which connects city centre with the northern and southern districts. It featured the first cross-platform transfer in the USSR. It was also the first metro line in Saint Petersburg to feature a unique platform type that soon became dubbed as "Horizontal Lift".
The line cuts Saint Petersburg on a north-south axis and is generally coloured blue on Metro maps. In 2006, as an extension was opened, it became the longest line on the system.

Timeline

Name changes

Transfers

The Tekhnologichesky Institut transfer is a cross-platform one.

Rolling stock
The line is served by the Moskovskoe (№ 3) depot, and has 56 six-carriage trains assigned to it. Most of these are of type 81-717/81-714, but some are the .5 standard, built in the 1970s through the 1990s. There are also newer 81-540.1/541.1 and .9 trains running since 2000.

Recent developments and future plans

The line is complete as such, and the recent extension to Parnas means that in the long future no future extensions will be built. However it is very likely that some of the central stations will be receiving much needed repairs internally and externally. 

Saint Petersburg Metro lines
Railway lines opened in 1961